The 1998–99 First League of FR Yugoslavia was the seventh season of the FR Yugoslavia's top-level football league since its establishment. It was contested by 18 teams, and Partizan won the championship (declared on 12 June 1999).

The championship was stopped on 14 May 1999, because of the NATO bombing of Yugoslavia, after 24 rounds.

Teams

League table

Results

Winning squad
Champions: Partizan Belgrade (Coach: Ljubiša Tumbaković)

Players (league matches/league goals)
  Nikola Damjanac
  Vuk Rašović
  Branko Savić
  Igor Duljaj
  Zoltan Sabo
  Marjan Gerasimovski
  Darko Tešović
  Goran Trobok
  Milan Stojanoski
  Nenad Bjeković
  Dragan Stojisavljević
  Darko Ljubanović
  Đorđe Svetličić
  Mateja Kežman
  Radiša Ilić (goalkeeper)
  Goran Obradović
  Ivica Iliev
  Vladimir Ivić
  Goran Arnaut
  Mladen Krstajić
  Dragan Čalija
  Saša Ilić
  Ljubiša Ranković
  Predrag Pažin
  Dragoljub Jeremić
  Đorđe Tomić
  Aleksandar Vuković
  Srđan Baljak
  Dejan Živković
Source:

Top goalscorers

References

External links 
 Tables and results at RSSSF

Yugoslav First League seasons
Yugo
1998–99 in Yugoslav football